The Los Angeles World Affairs Council & Town Hall (LAWACTH), the Los Angeles office within the national network of World Affairs Councils of America, is a non-profit, non-partisan organization which arranges speaker events, debates, seminars, and film screenings with international themes. It is a membership-based organization supported by membership fees and contributions. Speakers have included heads of state, political leaders, and entrepreneurs in technology and science.  A subset within the LAWAC is the Young Professionals program, which engages young people in the workforce in global affairs issues and networking.

History

LAWAC was founded in 1954.  Since that time, the Council has hosted eight US presidents and more than 250 heads of state and government. Most Los Angeles World Affairs Council events feature major international political figures in either speech or interview formats. Events are generally on weekday evenings. Question-and-answer sessions follow these remarks, offering opportunities for audiences to engage with speakers directly. Additionally, upper-level Council members are included in VIP receptions prior to events for discussion and photographs.

Notable Speakers

The council creates transcripts of the speeches and makes them available through its website archives.

Student Programs

The Council also has a high school program for which members can sponsor additional reservation fees to enable local high school groups to attend events. Students who participate in the Council's High School Program often engage in discussions with speakers prior to events. Internships are also available through the Council for local university students, enabling them to participate in event facilitation and general council operations.

References

 Loper, Mary Lou. "World Affairs Council: Balanced Talks." Los Angeles Times. April 2, 1987, Accessed April 8, 2015.

External links
 Los Angeles World Affairs Council Website
 Los Angeles World Affairs Council Facebook Page
 Los Angeles World Affairs Council YouTube Channel
 World Affairs Councils of America – Local Councils List
 Archive of events

Non-profit organizations based in Los Angeles
World Affairs Councils